Bhakta Prahlada is a 1932 Indian Telugu-language Hindu mythological film directed by H. M. Reddy and produced by Ardeshir Irani of Imperial Film Company. It is the first sound film of Telugu cinema. It features Sindhoori Krishna Rao as the titular Prahlada, along with Munipalle Subbayya, Surabhi Kamalabai, Doraswamy Naidu, Chitrapu Narasimha Rao, and L. V. Prasad. No complete synopsis of the film that is known to survive, but it is an adaptation of a play of the same name.

Having achieved success in Hindi cinema by releasing India's first sound film Alam Ara in 1931, Irani wanted to expand his scope to South Indian cinema. Bhakta Prahlada was released on 6 February 1932, and was positively received by the audience but variedly by critics, who panned its resemblance to the stage version, poor sound recording, and low-quality images. It is now lost; surviving artefacts include a few stills, advertisements, and reviews.

Plot 
The film is about the Hindu legendary figure Prahlada.

Cast 
The cast is adapted from The Hindu:
 Munipalle Subbayya as Hiranyakashipu
 Surabhi Kamalabai as Leelavathi
 Sindhoori Krishna Rao as Prahlada
 Doraswamy Naidu as Indra
 Chitrapu Narasimha Rao as Brahma and Chandamarkulu
 L. V. Prasad as Modhabbai

Production 

Following his success in Hindi cinema with India's first sound film Alam Ara (1931), the producer Ardeshir Irani decided to expand his career to South Indian cinema; his plan was to release one film each in Telugu and Tamil, which would later be titled Bhakta Prahlada and Kalidas (1931) respectively, in the same year. He entrusted their direction to his associate H. M. Reddy, a former English teacher at Jagirdars' College, Hyderabad, who in 1927 moved to Bombay (present-day Mumbai) due to a plague spreading in Hyderabad. Reddy later worked as a reflector man for Sarada Film Company; Irani spotted him there and employed Reddy for his Imperial Film Company.

Reddy adapted the story of a popular play of the same name, written either by Dharmavaram Ramakrishnamacharyulu or Surabhi Nataka Samajam. M. L. Narasimham of The Hindu reported in 2011 that Surabhi Theatres, who produced the play, was initially hesitant of the decision without mentioning the rationale. The same cast, all Telugus, was used for the film adaptation. In the history of Telugu sound films, Sindhoori Krishna Rao, who played the titular role of Prahlada, was the first protagonist; meanwhile, L. V. Prasad, also an assistant director, appeared as Prahlada's classmate and was the first actor to be given a comical role.

Principal photography was done by Adi M. Irani using the Parvo camera. H. R. Padmanabha Sastry from Prabhat Film Company composed the soundtrack, and the lyrics were provided by Ramakrishnamacharyulu and Chandala Kesavadasu, including poems by the 15th-century writer Pothana. Because playback singers were unpopular back then, actors were required to sing their lines with an orchestra located far from the camera. The film's duration was 108 minutes.

Release, reception, and legacy 
Bhakta Prahlada was believed to have been released on 15 September 1931, but the film historian Rentala Jayadeva found out that it actually premiered on 6 February 1932 (in Bombay). Jayadeva said it was impossible for the film to release before its 22 January 1932 censorship date. Bhakta Prahlada was released on 2 April 1932 in Madras (present-day Chennai). It was a commercial success but generated varied opinions from critics, owing to its resemblance to the stage version, poor sound recording, and the picture's low quality. The journalist Maddali Sathyanarayana Sarma, who saw the film twice, said the film has almost no differences with the stage version, but praised the sound and songs.

Now a lost film, surviving artefacts include a few stills, advertisements, and contemporary reviews. All early films were shot on highly flammable and silver-containing nitrate film. According to the archivist P. K. Nair, who founded the National Film Archive of India, 70 percent of pre-1950 Indian films are unavailable for archiving, probably due to fire or being stripped for the silver. It was only after 1951 that film producers started using cellulose acetate film, which is considered more fire-resistant. Bhakta Prahlada is regarded as the first released Telugu-language sound film. The story of Prahlada was adapted twice more in Telugu cinema in 1942 and 1967.

Notes

References

External links 
 

1930s Telugu-language films
1932 films
1932 lost films
Films about Hinduism
Films about Prahlada
Films based on the Bhagavata Purana
Films directed by H. M. Reddy
Films scored by H. R. Padmanabha Sastry
Films shot in Mumbai
Hindu mythological films
Indian black-and-white films
Lost Indian films